Alexander Viespi Jr. (May 3, 1933 – August 9, 2021), known professionally as Alex Cord, was an American actor, best known for his portrayal of Michael Coldsmith Briggs III, better known as Archangel, in 55 episodes of the television series Airwolf (1984–1986). Early in his career, he was credited as Alex Viespi.

Early life
Cord was born to an Italian family in Floral Park, New York, the son of Marie (Paladino) and Alexander Viespi, who was in the construction business. Cord was stricken with polio at the age of 12. His family then moved to Wyoming, where doctors advised him to take up horseback riding as a therapeutic exercise. This helped him recover from the disease by the time he was 16. Cord attended New York University in New York City and the American Shakespeare Theatre at Stratford, Connecticut.

Career
In July 1960, Cord (billed under his real name) acted in a production of The Curious Savage in Canal Fulton, Ohio. He had a role in the 1961 episode "The Mountain Men" of the TV series Laramie. Cord's second role came a month later as Nino Sanchez in the episode "Winter Quarters" of Frontier Circus. In 1962, he appeared as Larry Rome in the episode "Take a Number" of the crime drama Cain's Hundred.

Cord appeared in the 1962 film The Chapman Report, directed by George Cukor. He briefly enjoyed a leading man status on the big and small screen during the 1960s and 1970s, and starred or co-starred in mostly crime dramas, action films, and westerns.

In 1963 and 1964, Cord was cast as different characters in five episodes of the series Route 66, including the role of Michael in the two-part "Where There's a Will, There's a Way." In 1964, he played the part of Sam in the episode "If Your Grandmother Had Wheels" of East Side/West Side. During this same period, he appeared twice on Naked City.

In 1965, Cord was cast as Jed Colbee in the episode "Survival" of Branded. In 1966, he played the Ringo Kid in a remake of Stagecoach, which arguably remains Cord's most heavily publicized endeavor, during which he was ballyhooed in the press as a former football player since the role was originally portrayed by minor college football player John Wayne (who had since starred in eighty Western movies, usually with his name above the title, throughout the 1930s) in John Ford's 1939 version. Cord co-starred in The Brotherhood with Kirk Douglas, about a Mafia figure being sent to murder his own brother.

He guest-starred on the Rod Serling anthology series Night Gallery where he met his co-star and wife Joanna Pettet while filming the episode "Keep in Touch - We'll Think of Something". In 1974, Cord twice guest-starred on the NBC series Born Free, and he appeared in the motion picture Chosen Survivors.

Cord is among a handful of actors to appear on both the original and revival versions of CBS's Mission: Impossible. Cord also is known to science fiction enthusiasts for having portrayed Dylan Hunt in the failed 1973 television pilot Genesis II, which was created by Gene Roddenberry. In 1977, he starred as the title character in the epic western Grayeagle.

In 1972, he appeared as Pete Brown in the episode "The Sodbusters" of Gunsmoke. In 1973, he played the role of Haynes in "The Night of the Long Knives" on The F.B.I.. From 1973 to 1976, he appeared in four episodes of Police Story. In 1979 and 1981, he appeared twice on The Love Boat. In 1984 Cord starred in Airwolf The Movie a two-hour pilot of the subsequent series. In 1988, Cord was cast in an episode of Simon and Simon; in 1988 and 1992, he appeared on Jake and the Fatman. He also appeared in a 1988 episode of the TV series War of the Worlds. He appeared twice in Murder, She Wrote. In 1995, Cord played the character Larry Curtis in the episode "The Guardians" of Walker, Texas Ranger.

Personal life 
Cord had three children, daughter Toni Aluisa and sons Wayne Viespi and Damien Zachary Cord. Toni is the daughter of Mary Ann Hutchinson, whom Alex never married, and Wayne was the product of his first marriage. His second marriage was to actress Joanna Pettet with whom he had Damien. His third marriage was to equestrienne/author Susannah Boye-Moller Cord.

Cord lived in Cooke County, Texas. Cord suggested that Robert Fuller, his friend from Laramie, also move to Texas to raise horses. Fuller and his second wife Jennifer Savidge did relocate to Cooke County in 2004. Cord and Fuller often made appearances at western film festivals, highlighting their continuing mutual interest in "The Spirit of the Cowboy". Cord died at his home in Valley View, Texas on August 9, 2021, at the age of 88.

Filmography

Film

Television

Awards
 Award of the London Critics Circle, nominee for Best Actor
 1966 Golden Laurel, nominee for New Faces
 2001 Golden Boot Award, winner

Bibliography
 Alex Cord: Sandsong; Warner Books, 1976 (ASIN: B000R321IY)
 Alex Cord: A Feather in the Rain; Five Star Publications, 1995

Notes

External links
 
 

1933 births
2021 deaths
People from Floral Park, New York
New York University alumni
People from Wyoming
People from Cooke County, Texas
Ranchers from Texas
American male television actors
Male actors from Los Angeles
People with polio
American people of Italian descent
20th-century American male actors
21st-century American male actors